The New Brunswick Curling Association (NBCA) is the provincial governing body for the sport of curling in the province of New Brunswick, Canada. The NBCA was formed from the amalgamation of separate men's and women's associations in 1989.

Marg Maranda is the executive director for the New Brunswick Curling Association.

Events

Provincial
The New Brunswick Curling Association hosts the following events on a yearly basis:
NB Tankard - men's provincial championship, for qualification to the men's nationals
New Brunswick Scotties Tournament of Hearts - women's provincial championship, for qualification to the women's nationals 
Mixed Doubles
Seniors (Men's & Women's)
Club Championship (Men's & Women's)
Mixed
Masters (Men's & Women's)
U 21 Final 8 (Men's & Women's)
Moncton Little rocks Jamboree
U-18 Championship (Boys & Girls)
U-15 Kenny Coates  (Boys & Girls)
Junior Mixed 
Provincial Little rocks Jamboree
Atlantic University Sport

National/International
The New Brunswick Curling Association has hosted the following major events:
Canadian Men's Curling Championship
1947 Saint John
1956 Moncton
1975 Fredericton
1985 Moncton
Canadian Women's Curling Championship
1963 Saint John
1975 Moncton
1988 Fredericton
World Men's Curling Championship
2009 Moncton

See also
List of curling clubs in New Brunswick

References

External links
Official site

Curling
Curling governing bodies in Canada
Curling in New Brunswick